Nilima Jogalekar (born 1 July 1961) is an Indian cricketer. She was the team wicket-keeper and a middle order batsman. She represented Maharashtra in women's domestic cricket, making her international debut in the 1978 Women's Cricket World Cup as Nilima Barve (her maiden name)

Career
Nilima Jogalekar played 6 Test matches and 20 ODI matches spread over seven years and four international series. She played in the following series:
 1978 Women's Cricket World Cup (1 ODI) 
 1982 Women's Cricket World Cup (12 ODIs)
 1983/84 Australia Women in India (4 ODIs and 4 Test matches)
 1984/85 New Zealand Women in India (3 ODIs and 2 Test matches)

Nilima Jogalekar captained India in one Test match (against New Zealand) when she stood in for Diana Edulji.

In 2016, Jogalekar was felicitated by the Board of Control for Cricket in India on the occasion of India playing its 500th Test against New Zealand at the Green Park Stadium. Among other women captions to be honoured were Diana Edulji, Promila Rao and Shantha Rangaswamy.

References

Living people
1961 births
Indian women cricketers
India women Test cricketers
India women One Day International cricketers
Maharashtra women cricketers
Indian women cricket captains
Sportswomen from Maharashtra
Cricketers from Maharashtra
Wicket-keepers